Meconella is a small genus of flowering plants in the poppy family. They are known generally as fairypoppies.

Species
There are about 3 species:

A fourth species, Meconella linearis, is sometimes treated as Platystigma linearis or Hesperomecon linearis.

The species are endemic from British Columbia, Canada south to California.

References

External links
Jepson Manual Treatment: Meconella
USDA Plants Profile: Meconella

Papaveroideae
Papaveraceae genera
Flora of the West Coast of the United States
Taxa named by Thomas Nuttall